is a private Junior College in Japan that headquartered Nagasaki Prefecture Nagasaki City Mitsuyamamachi235.
 It was set up in 1950, and the student was recruited in fiscal year 2004.
 The abbreviation of the university is Junshin junior college. It is Nagasaki Junshin Catholic University now.

External links
 Nagasaki Junshin Junior College 

Educational institutions established in 1950
Japanese junior colleges
Private universities and colleges in Japan
Universities and colleges in Nagasaki Prefecture
1950 establishments in Japan